Perm State Humanitarian Pedagogical University is a public university located in Perm, Russia. It was founded in 1921.

History
In 1916, it was decided to open a branch of the Imperial Petrograd University in Perm, which a year later became the independent Perm State University. The newly built building of the Provincial Zemstvo Office on Sibirskaya Street was given to the needs of the university.

On October 2, 1919 the Institute of public education (INE) was created in Perm. On September 9, 1921 by resolution of the planning committee of the Main Department of Education the Perm Institute of Public Education was transformed into a teacher training institute, which is considered to be the official date of its birth. Initially it had three departments: pre-school education, pedagogical and school-instructional. However, in 1922 the institute ceased to exist as an independent educational institution.

In July, 1922 the teachers and students of the institute were united with the Perm state university; together with the faculty of social sciences and shortened physical and mathematical faculty they formed the Pedagogical department - the largest one among the faculties of Perm university. Pedagogical Faculty and the PSU Board were located in the building along Sibirskaya Street. The Pedagogical faculty was one of the biggest in the university structure with more than 900 students.

On the 15th of October 1930 the Pedagogical department was reorganized into an independent educational institution - Perm Industrial and Pedagogical Institute, by the order of Narkompros (People's Commissariat for Education). At the time of its establishment the Institute had 9 departments. From October 15, 1930 to 1940 it had trained 4000 teachers.

In the post-war years, new faculties were opened at the institute, including foreign languages. In the 1950s, a new academic building on Pushkin Street was built, and later two more buildings were added. by the 1970s, the institute had become one of the leading pedagogical universities in the country.

In 1994, the status of the university was changed: based on the results of the attestation, Perm State Pedagogical Institute was renamed into Perm State Pedagogical University (PSPU) by Order No. 290 of the Minister of Education of the Russian Federation of July 27, 1994. In 2012, in accordance with the order of the Ministry of Education and Science on May 25, 2012, the Perm State Pedagogical University was renamed into Perm State University for Humanities and Pedagogy (PGPU).

At the beginning of the 2020s the university has more than 7000 students. Specialist diploma (5 years of training) can be obtained in 26 specialties, Bachelor diploma (4 years) in 2 directions, Master degree (6 years) in one direction. There are postgraduate departments in 14 specialties and doctoral department in "General psychology, personality psychology, history of psychology".

Structure
 Mathematics Faculty
 Faculty of Philology
 Faculty of History
 Faculty of Physics
 Natural Science faculty
 Faculty of Informatics and Economics
 Faculty of foreign languages
 Faculty of Music
 Faculty of Physical Education
 Faculty of Pedagogy and Childhood Psychology
 Faculty of Pedagogy and Methodology of Primary Education 
 Faculty of Law and Social and Pedagogical Education 
 Institute of Psychology.

Notes and references

Universities and colleges in Perm, Russia
Teachers colleges in Russia
1921 establishments in Russia